Marriage Boot Camp is an American reality television series aired on WE tv that debuted on May 31, 2013, as Marriage Boot Camp: Bridezillas which initially aired as a spin-off to Bridezillas. The series was renamed from Marriage Boot Camp: Bridezillas to Marriage Boot Camp: Reality Stars following the second season. The first two seasons documented couples who had previously been featured on Bridezillas, as they move into a house together to receive help in repairing their relationship. Following the second season, the series began featuring current and former reality stars moving into the house with their significant others to receive help in repairing their relationships also.

Series overview

Episodes

Season 1 (2013)

Season 2 (2014)

Season 3 (2014)

Season 4 (2015)

Season 5 (2015)

Season 6 (2015–16)

Season 7 (2016)

Season 8 (2016)

Season 9 (2017)

Season 10 (2017)

Season 11 (2017)

Season 12 (2018)

Season 13 (2018)

Season 14 (2019)

Season 15 (2019)

Season 16 (2020)

Season 17 (2020)

Season 18 (2021)

Season 19 (2022)

References

External links 
 
Marriage Boot Camp: Reality Stars Family Edition Official website
 
 

Lists of American non-fiction television series episodes
Lists of reality television series episodes